Birsinghpur  is a sub district in Satna District in the state of Madhya Pradesh, India

Demographics 

As of the 2011 Census of India, Birsinghpur had a population of 14339. Males constituted 52.21% of the population and females 47.79%.

Geography 
Birsinghpur is a Nagar Parishad on Madhya Pradesh and a tehseel of 134 villages and 1 Nagar Parishad. Birsinghpur is situated on the north east in Satna district, at a distance of about 36 km from Satna and 61 km from Rewa. Another road goes from Birsinghpur to Satna, Madhya Pradesh via Jaitwar, Kothi (MP SH-52). Birsinghpur has a 10th century temple of Lord Shiva, which is  also known as the Gaivinath temple. Birsinghpur is a one of major pilgrim center for local area around Satna and Rewa district.

Infrastructure 
There is a government hospital in Birsinghpur. The nearest airport is in Satna. There is also a government industrial training institute in Birsinghpur.
Nearby tourist spot are Dharkundi Ashram, Sutikshna Ashram, and Sarbhanga.

See also
 List of Hindu temples in India

References

External links

Cities and towns in Satna district